Michele Rech (born 12 December 1983), known as Zerocalcare, is an Italian cartoonist. His pen name, literally meaning "zero limescale", was inspired by an Italian TV commercial jingle for a descaler product because he had to choose a nickname to quickly join a discussion on the Internet.

Biography

Early life 
Rech was born in Cortona, Italy, to an Italian father from Rome and a French mother. He was raised in France, then later Rome (Rebibbia-Ponte Mammolo area), where he graduated at the Lycée français Chateaubriand.

Career (2003-present) 
In 2003, at the age of 20, Rech began working as an illustrator for Liberazione, Carta, La Repubblica XL, and several other periodicals. At this time, he also wrote a webcomic titled Safe Inside for Zuda Comics, the online division of DC Comics. In 2004 he created a comic about the G8 summit in Genoa, which had taken place three years before.

Zerocalcare published his first graphic novel in October 2011 titled The Armadillo Prophecy, and in November created zerocalcare.it, a website where he published autobiographical comic strips. In September 2012, the blog won the Macchianera Award as 'Best draftsman-Cartoonist' and the Gran Guinigi Award at Lucca Comics for best short story with The Armadillo Prophecy. On October 2014, he made a variant cover for Marvel's Guardians of the Galaxy, released during Lucca Comics by Panini Comics' Italian division.

In April 2016, Rech's fourth graphic novel Kobane Calling: Greetings from Northern Syria was published in Italian and later in English. The material had been previously published in 'Internazionale' and focused on the conflict between the Kurds and the Islamic State. In 2017 Kobane Calling won the Micheluzzi Award as best cartoon at Naples Comicon. In October 2017, a film based on his first graphic novel La profezia dell'armadillo entered production with Fandango (a Fremantle subsidiary) and Rai Cinema. Zerocalcare was one of four screenwriters on the movie.

On 14 January 2018 L'Espresso published a short comic by Zerocalcare titled 'Questa non è una partita a bocce, focusing on the rise of Neo-fascist movements in Italy, and on 3 September 2018 the film La profezia dell'armadillo was released. Shortly afterward, in November, the MAXXI museum of Rome hosted an exhibition of Zerocalcare's works, titled Zerocalcare. Scavare fossati, Nutrire coccodrilli. It lasted until March of 2019. That same month a theatrical adaption of Kobane Calling: Greetings from Northern Syria debuted at Teatro del Giglio in Lucca, during Lucca Comics & Games 2019 and toured as part of the 2019/2020 theatre season. In 2020, Zerocalcare got high visibility, particularly thanks to the animated shorts Rebibbia Quarantine broadcast on LA7 on the Propaganda Live program during lockdown due to the COVID-19 pandemic in Italy. On the same year, he made varant covers for Marvel's Absolute Carnage comic book miniseries, only released in Italy. He wrote an introduction for the Italian edition of TRANSito, a transgender-themed comic by Ian Bermúdez drawn by David Cantero, released in Italy in March 2020.

On 21 December 2020 Zerocalcare announced that he would be creating an animated series for Netflix titled Tear Along the Dotted Line. Ten months later, on 8 October 2021, Netflix released a teaser trailer for the show, which announced the show’s 17 November 2021 release date. The show premiered ten days later, on 18 October, at the Rome Film Fest. On 16 November Ablaze Publishing announced that they would be releasing English translations of Zerocalcare's first three graphic novels, The Armadillo Prophecy (2011), Tentacles At My Throat (2012) and  Forget My Name (2014). Tear Along the Dotted Line was released through Netflix on 17 November 2021. Early reviews have been positive. An animated series featuring the same team of creators, titled This World Won't Make Me Evil, is currently in production.

On 4 October 2022, Rech's new graphic novel No Sleep till Shengal was published in Italian. It focuses on the persecution of Yazidis in Iraq.

 Works 
 Comics 
Graphic novels
 The Armadillo Prophecy (La profezia dell'armadillo). Edizioni Graficart. 2011.
 
 Dodici. BAO Publishing. 2013.
 
 
 Macerie prime. BAO Publishing. 2017.
 Macerie prime. Sei mesi dopo. BAO Publishing. 2017.
  (with R/Push)
 
 Scheletri. BAO Publishing. 2020.
 A Babbo morto. Una storia di Natale. BAO Publishing. 2020.
 

 Short Comics
 Sparare a zero. Best Movie. September 24th 2014-ongoing.
 Se Zerocalcare avesse scelto un panda anziché un armadillo?. in 
 Kobane Calling: Greetings from Northern Syria (Kobane Calling). Internazionale. October 2nd 2015. 
 La città del decoro (Città dei Puffi). La Repubblica. May 10th 2015.
 Ferro e piume. Internazionale. October 2nd 2015.
 Groviglio. La Repubblica. 2016. December 24th 2016.
 Così passi dalla parte del torto. in 
 Questa non è una partita a bocce. l'Espresso. January 14th 2018.
 C'è un quartiere che resiste. Internazionale. March 29th 2019.
 Macelli. Internazionale. July 19th 2019.
 Lontano dagli occhi, lontano dal cuore. Internazionale Extra. December 2020.
 Romanzo sanitario. l'Espresso. March 28th, 2021.
 La dittatura immaginaria. Internazionale. May 14th, 2021.
 Etichette. Internazionale. July 16th, 2021.
 Strati. L'Essenziale. February 19th, 2022.
 La voragine. L'Essenziale. December 5th, 2022.

Collections
 Ogni maledetto lunedì su due. BAO Publishing. 2013.
 Collects the 2011 - 2013 'zerocalcare.it' strips, as well as a new 50 page comic.
L'elenco telefonico degli accolli. BAO Publishing. 2015.
Second collection of 'zerocalcare.it' strips from 2014 - 2015, as well a new 45 page comic.
 La scuola di pizze in faccia del professor Calcare. BAO Publishing. 2019.
 Collects short comics published between May 10, 2015 - February 22, 2019, as well as a new comic divided into three parts. 
 Niente di nuovo sul fronte di Rebibbia. BAO Publishing. 2021.
Collects short comics from 2019 - 2021, as well as a new comic divided into five parts.

 Essays and critique 
 
 

 Forewords 

 
 

 Cover arts 
Guardians of the Galaxy #0. Panini Comics. October 2014 (variant).
Go Home - A Casa Loro. October 2018.
In questa città. Warner Music Italy. November 2019.
 Absolute Carnage. Panini Comics. January 2020 (variant).
 
 Sembro matto. Warner Music Italy. March 2020.
 Middlewest. Vol.1. BAO Publishing. October 2020 (variant) 
 

 Filmography 

 Awards and Nominees Awards 2009: Zuda Comics Competition of January 2009 for Safe Inside.
2012:
Macchianera Italian Awards as 'Best draftsman-Cartoonist'.
XL  Award for The Armadillo Prophecy.
Micheluzzi Award for the 'best webcomic' for zerocalcare.it.
 2013:
 XL Award and Micheluzzi Award for the 'best comic book' for Tentacles at My Throat.
 'Archivio Disarmo - Colombe d'Oro per la Pace' Journalistic Award.
 Lucca Comics & Games' Gran Guinigi Award for the 'best short story' for The Armadillo Prophecy.
 2014: 'Satira politica di Forte dei Marmi' Award for the best 'satirical drawing'.
 2017: Micheluzzi Award for the 'best short story' for Kobane Calling: Greetings From Northern Syria, on Internazionale n°1085.
 2018: Mondadori Public Award during the Micheluzzi Awards for Forget My Name.
 2021: Fabrique Award for the 'best TV series' for Tear Along the Dotted LineNominees'''
Finalist at the Strega Prize in the 'young' category for Forget My Name.
Finalist at the Québec Libraries Prize for Forget My Name''.

References

External links 

 Official blog

 
Italian comics artists
Italian graphic novelists
Artists from Rome
Italian people of French descent
Pseudonymous artists
Italian cartoonists
Living people
1983 births